Czech Republic competed at the 2015 World Aquatics Championships in Kazan, Russia from 24 July to 9 August 2015.

High diving

Czech Republic has qualified one high diver.

Open water swimming

Czech Republic fielded a full team of six swimmers to compete in the open water marathon.

Men

Women

Mixed

Swimming

Czech swimmers earned qualifying standards in the following events (up to a maximum of 2 swimmers in each event at the A-standard entry time, and 1 at the B-standard):

Men

Women

Synchronized swimming

Czech Republic has qualified four synchronized swimmers.

Women

Mixed

References

External links
Český svaz plaveckých sportů web site 

Nations at the 2015 World Aquatics Championships
2015 in Czech sport
Czech Republic at the World Aquatics Championships